Metallarcha beatalis is a moth in the family Crambidae. It was described by Cajetan Felder, Rudolf Felder and Alois Friedrich Rogenhofer in 1875. It is found in Australia, where it has been recorded from Victoria, South Australia and Western Australia.

References

Moths described in 1875
Spilomelinae